Fobney Lock is a lock on the River Kennet in the Small Mead area of Reading in the English county of Berkshire. Between the lock cut for the lock and the river itself is Fobney Island, which is a nature reserve.

Fobney Lock was built between 1718 and 1723 under the supervision of the engineer John Hore of Newbury, and this stretch of the river is now administered by Canal & River Trust and known as the Kennet Navigation. It has a rise/fall of 7 ft 8 in (2.24 m).

Fobney Island was transformed into a nature reserve in 2013, with the creation of wetland, a hay meadow and reed beds. It was intended that the resulting habitats would attract wildlife, including birds, bats, water voles, and otters.

References

See also

Locks on the Kennet and Avon Canal

Locks of Reading, Berkshire
Locks on the Kennet and Avon Canal